Adam Bowden (born 5 August 1982) is a British international triathlete and former international runner who specialized in the 3000 metres steeplechase.

Early life and education
Adam is originally from Watford, Hertfordshire and was educated at St. Michael's Catholic High School. He was a national level swimmer as a teenager before concentrating on athletics.

Athletics
As an athlete, he represented Great Britain on the road, cross country and track. He is a member of Harrow athletic club and holds the club records for 3,000 metres Steeplechase and 10,000 metres. In 2001 he represented Great Britain in the World Junior Cross Country Championships and finished 6th in the European Junior Cross Country Championships later that year behind Mo Farah (who finished second). In 2006 he competed in the Commonwealth Games (finishing 9th) and European Championships steeplechase. After missing 2007 through injury, Adam won the 2008 UK Olympic trials in the 3000 metres Steeplechase.

Triathlon
Since 2008, Adam has been a professional triathlete, and is currently trains at the Welsh triathlon centre based at Cardiff Metropolitan University. Following a 2016 ITU World Triathlon Series where he finished the season ranked in 9th place, Adam achieved his highest placing in an individual ITU World Triathlon Series event of 4th, at the Leeds round in 2017 ITU World Triathlon Series.

Personal bests
All information from Power of 10

References

External links
 
 
 

1982 births
Living people
Sportspeople from Watford
English male triathletes
English male long-distance runners
English male steeplechase runners
English male cross country runners
Commonwealth Games competitors for England
Athletes (track and field) at the 2006 Commonwealth Games
British Athletics Championships winners